This was the first edition of the tournament.

Guido Andreozzi and Guillermo Durán won the title after defeating Renzo Olivo and Miguel Ángel Reyes-Varela 6–7(5–7), 7–6(7–5), [11–9] in the final.

Seeds

Draw

References

External links
 Main draw

Porto Challenger - Doubles